Trop de bonheur (English: Too Much Happiness) is a 1994 French comedy drama film directed by Cédric Kahn, who co-wrote the screenplay with Ismaël Ferroukhi.

The film won the Cannes Film Festival's Youth Award, the Prix Jean Vigo, and Special Mention at the Torino International Festival of Young Cinema.

Cast
Malek Bechar as  Kamel 
Naguime Bendidi   
Didier Borga as  Didier 
Salah Bouchouareb   
Caroline Ducey as  Mathilde 
Emmanuel Gautier   
Laetitia Palermo as  Solange 
Estelle Perron as  Valerie

External links

Films directed by Cédric Kahn
French comedy-drama films
1994 comedy-drama films
1994 films
1990s French films